Eastrea railway station was a station serving the village of Eastrea, Cambridgeshire on the Great Eastern Railway's line from Ely to Peterborough. The station was situated at the level crossing on the road leading south from the village towards Benwick. Two miles east of the station was Three Horseshoes junction from where the Benwick goods railway headed south to Benwick.

Summary of services

Sample train timetable for February 1863 
The table below shows the train departures from Eastrea on weekdays in February 1863. There was no Sunday service. Eastrea was a request stop. Passengers wishing to alight had to inform the guard at the previous station and those wishing to join had to signal to the driver as the train approached.

References

Disused railway stations in Cambridgeshire
Former Great Eastern Railway stations
Railway stations in Great Britain opened in 1845
Railway stations in Great Britain closed in 1866
Whittlesey